The Fort Neuf de Vincennes ("New Vincennes Fort") is a fortification built on the grounds of the Château de Vincennes, on the east side of Paris. While the old chateau had been a significant fortification in its time, by 1840 there was a need for a modern fort at that location, capable of using and defending itself against artillery fire. A new bastioned fort was built to the east of the historic chateau.

Function 
The fort remains the property of the Ministry of Defense, supporting a variety of Army activities. Public access is restricted. The fort houses the military archives of the Army, Navy and Air Force. The nearby chateau is a museum.

History 

Built between 1841 and 1844, the Fort Neuf is one of seventeen forts built as part of the Thiers Wall fortifications for the defense of the capital. During the Siege of Paris (1870–1871) the fort was the headquarters for General Ribourt, in command of the area around Vincennes.

German spy Mata-Hari was executed at the fort on 15 October 1917.

The fort was the scene of the trials of Jean Bastien-Thiry and the other conspirators in the Petit-Clamart 1962 attempt on the life of President Charles de Gaulle, in which Bastien-Thiry was condemned to death by firing squad.

See also 
 Fortifications of Paris in the 19th and 20th centuries

References 

 Le château de Vincennes aux XIXe-XXe siècles, Jean Chapelot

External links 
 Fort Neuf de Vincennes

Fortifications of Paris
Buildings and structures in Val-de-Marne